Palindroma is a genus of spiders in the family Zodariidae. The specific name of each species (Palindroma aleykyela, P. avonova, P. morogorom,  P. obmoimiombo, and P. sinis) is a palindrome, a word that reads the same backwards or forwards.

References

Spiders of Africa
Zodariidae
Araneomorphae genera